Schulz Crag is a rock summit (1110 m) in eastern Halfway Nunatak named after Thomas J. Schulz, United States Geological Survey (USGS) cartographer; member of the 1982–83 geodetic control team in the McMurdo Dry Valleys, the first joint US-NZ cooperative effort to establish mapping control in order to map the entire region at 1:50,000 scale.

Cliffs of the Ross Dependency
Hillary Coast